These are the results of the 2010 United Kingdom general election in England. The election was held on 6 May 2010 and all 533 seats in England were contested. The Conservative Party achieved a complete majority of English seats, but fared less well in Scotland and Wales, so a coalition government was subsequently formed between the Conservatives and the Liberal Democrats.

Results table

Regional results

Regional vote shares and changes are sourced from the BBC.

East Midlands

East of England

London

North East

North West

South East

South West

West Midlands

Yorkshire and Humber

See also
 2010 United Kingdom general election in Northern Ireland
 2010 United Kingdom general election in Scotland
 2010 United Kingdom general election in Wales

References

England
2010 in England
General elections in England to the Parliament of the United Kingdom